Prosoplus is a genus of longhorn beetles of the subfamily Lamiinae, containing the following species:

subgenus Escharodes
 Prosoplus carinicollis (Pascoe, 1864)
 Prosoplus celebicus Breuning, 1959
 Prosoplus convexicollis Breuning, 1951
 Prosoplus criminosus (Pascoe, 1864)
 Prosoplus distinctus (Pascoe, 1864)
 Prosoplus flavoguttatus (Aurivillius, 1925)
 Prosoplus fuscobasalis Breuning, 1947
 Prosoplus granulifer Breuning, 1939
 Prosoplus granulosus (Breuning, 1938)
 Prosoplus interruptus (Pascoe, 1864)
 Prosoplus invidus (Pascoe, 1864)
 Prosoplus paganoides Breuning, 1940
 Prosoplus paganus (Pascoe, 1864)
 Prosoplus parapaganus Breuning, 1976
 Prosoplus parvulus (Breuning, 1938)
 Prosoplus strenuus (Pascoe, 1864)
 Prosoplus subinterruptus Breuning, 1969
 Prosoplus sumatranus Breuning & de Jong, 1941
 Prosoplus tuberosicollis Breuning, 1939

subgenus Ochreoprosoplus
 Prosoplus bialbomaculatus Breuning, 1959
 Prosoplus ochreopictus Breuning, 1940

subgenus Prosoplus
 Prosoplus abdominalis (White, 1858)
 Prosoplus affectus (Pascoe, 1864)
 Prosoplus affinis Breuning, 1938 
 Prosoplus albertisi Breuning, 1943
 Prosoplus albescens Breuning, 1938
 Prosoplus albidus Aurivillius, 1917
 Prosoplus albifrons Breuning, 1963
 Prosoplus albofasciatus Breuning, 1938
 Prosoplus albomarmoratus Breuning, 1938
 Prosoplus albosticticus Breuning, 1938
 Prosoplus albostriatus Breuning, 1938
 Prosoplus albovestitus Breuning, 1970
 Prosoplus aluensis Breuning, 1961
 Prosoplus amboinicus Breuning, 1974
 Prosoplus ammiralis Breuning, 1938
 Prosoplus aneityumensis Breuning, 1974
 Prosoplus aruensis Breuning, 1966
 Prosoplus aspersus (Montrouzier, 1855)
 Prosoplus assimilis (Montrouzier, 1855)
 Prosoplus atlanticus Breuning, 1938
 Prosoplus auberti Breuning, 1961
 Prosoplus australis (Montrouzier, 1861)
 Prosoplus bakewellii (Pascoe, 1859)
 Prosoplus bankii (Fabricius, 1775)
 Prosoplus basalis Breuning, 1938
 Prosoplus basigranulatus Breuning & de Jong, 1941
 Prosoplus basimaculatus Breuning, 1938
 Prosoplus basiochraceus Breuning, 1943
 Prosoplus basivittatus Breuning, 1940
 Prosoplus beccarii Breuning, 1939
 Prosoplus bellus Breuning, 1949
 Prosoplus bicoloripennis Breuning, 1953
 Prosoplus bilatemaculatus Breuning, 1959
 Prosoplus bimaculatus Aurivillius, 1907
 Prosoplus bimaculipennis Breuning, 1961
 Prosoplus bougainvillei Breuning, 1954
 Prosoplus brunneus Breuning, 1938
 Prosoplus carinatus Breuning, 1938
 Prosoplus celebensis Breuning & de Jong, 1941
 Prosoplus celebianus Breuning, 1971
 Prosoplus comosus (Newman, 1842)
 Prosoplus costatus Hüdepohl, 1996
 Prosoplus cylindricus Breuning, 1953
 Prosoplus decussatus Breuning, 1957
 Prosoplus demarzi Breuning, 1963
 Prosoplus densepunctatus Breuning, 1938
 Prosoplus densepuncticollis Breuning, 1969
 Prosoplus dentatus (Olivier, 1792)
 Prosoplus dubiosus Breuning, 1943
 Prosoplus dunni Breuning, 1976
 Prosoplus elongatus Breuning, 1938
 Prosoplus encaustus (Pascoe, 1864)
 Prosoplus endata (McKeown, 1942)
 Prosoplus fergussoni Breuning, 1970
 Prosoplus fijianus Breuning, 1948
 Prosoplus flavescens Breuning, 1938
 Prosoplus flavosticticus Breuning, 1938
 Prosoplus florensis Breuning, 1969
 Prosoplus funebris Breuning, 1939
 Prosoplus fuscomaculatus Breuning, 1938
 Prosoplus fuscosignatus Breuning, 1974
 Prosoplus fuscosticticus Breuning, 1961
 Prosoplus gebiensis Breuning, 1958
 Prosoplus giloloensis Breuning, 1943
 Prosoplus griseofasciatus Breuning, 1938
 Prosoplus grisescens Breuning, 1938
 Prosoplus grossepunctatus Breuning, 1938
 Prosoplus hebridarum Breuning, 1961
 Prosoplus hibisci Gressitt, 1956
 Prosoplus hirsutus Breuning, 1938
 Prosoplus imitans Breuning, 1961
 Prosoplus infelix (Pascoe, 1864)
 Prosoplus intercalaris (Pascoe, 1867)
 Prosoplus intermissus (Pascoe, 1864)
 Prosoplus javanicus Aurivillius, 1916
 Prosoplus jobiensis Breuning, 1938
 Prosoplus jubatus (Pascoe, 1864)
 Prosoplus kambangensis Breuning & de Jong, 1941
 Prosoplus kinabaluensis Breuning, 1966
 Prosoplus laevepunctatus Breuning, 1938
 Prosoplus latefasciatus Breuning, 1959
 Prosoplus laterialbus Breuning, 1971
 Prosoplus laterinigricollis Breuning, 1961
 Prosoplus lividus Matsushita, 1935
 Prosoplus longulus Breuning, 1938
 Prosoplus loriai Breuning, 1939
 Prosoplus luzonicus Breuning, 1960
 Prosoplus maculosus (Pascoe, 1864)
 Prosoplus major Gressitt, 1956
 Prosoplus majoripennis Breuning, 1972
 Prosoplus marianarum Aurivillius, 1908
 Prosoplus marmoratus Breuning, 1938
 Prosoplus marmoreus Breuning, 1938
 Prosoplus mediofasciatus Breuning, 1938
 Prosoplus mediovittatus Breuning, 1961
 Prosoplus metallescens Breuning, 1938
 Prosoplus metallicus (Pic, 1935)
 Prosoplus mindanaonis Breuning, 1974
 Prosoplus minimus Breuning, 1938
 Prosoplus molestus (Pascoe, 1864)
 Prosoplus morokaiensis Breuning, 1968
 Prosoplus multiguttatus Breuning, 1938
 Prosoplus multimaculatus Breuning, 1943
 Prosoplus neopomerianus Breuning, 1938
 Prosoplus niasicus Breuning, 1939
 Prosoplus nigrosignatus Breuning, 1950
 Prosoplus nitens Breuning, 1938
 Prosoplus obiensis Breuning, 1968
 Prosoplus obliqueplagiatus Breuning, 1938
 Prosoplus obliquestriatus Breuning, 1938
 Prosoplus obliquevittatus Breuning, 1970
 Prosoplus oblitus (Pascoe, 1863)
 Prosoplus ochraceomarmoratus Breuning, 1938
 Prosoplus ochreobasalis Breuning, 1942 inq.
 Prosoplus ochreosparsus Breuning, 1938
 Prosoplus ochreosticticus Breuning & de Jong, 1941
 Prosoplus ominosus (Pascoe, 1864)
 Prosoplus ornatifrons Breuning, 1938
 Prosoplus papuanus Breuning, 1938
 Prosoplus parallelus Breuning, 1938
 Prosoplus parasilis Breuning, 1978
 Prosoplus pauxillus (Blackburn, 1901)
 Prosoplus peraffinis Breuning, 1938
 Prosoplus persimilis Breuning, 1938
 Prosoplus petechialis (Pascoe, 1865)
 Prosoplus pictus Breuning, 1939 
 Prosoplus pilipennis Breuning, 1982
 Prosoplus pilosus Breuning, 1938
 Prosoplus pseudobasalis Breuning, 1938
 Prosoplus pseudovalgus Breuning, 1938
 Prosoplus pulcher (Aurivillius, 1908)
 Prosoplus pullatus (Pascoe, 1859)
 Prosoplus romani Breuning, 1938
 Prosoplus rosselli Breuning, 1982
 Prosoplus rufobrunneus Breuning, 1938
 Prosoplus rugulosus Breuning, 1938
 Prosoplus samoanus Aurivillius, 1913
 Prosoplus schultzei Breuning, 1960
 Prosoplus seriemaculatus Breuning, 1961
 Prosoplus setipes Breuning, 1970
 Prosoplus signatoides Breuning, 1939
 Prosoplus similis Breuning, 1961
 Prosoplus sinuatofasciatus Blanchard, 1855
 Prosoplus sinuatus Breuning, 1938
 Prosoplus sparsutus (Pascoe, 1864)
 Prosoplus strandi Breuning, 1938
 Prosoplus strandiellus Breuning, 1938
 Prosoplus sturninus (Pascoe, 1864)
 Prosoplus subcarinatus Breuning, 1970
 Prosoplus subviduatus Breuning, 1976
 Prosoplus sumatrensis Breuning, 1973
 Prosoplus tenimberensis Breuning, 1965
 Prosoplus ternatensis Breuning, 1943
 Prosoplus toekanensis Breuning, 1959
 Prosoplus tristiculus Breuning, 1939
 Prosoplus trobriandensis Breuning, 1947
 Prosoplus truncatus (Pascoe, 1864)
 Prosoplus tulagensis Breuning, 1961
 Prosoplus unicolor Breuning, 1938
 Prosoplus uniformis (Pascoe, 1864)
 Prosoplus vanicorensis Breuning, 1940
 Prosoplus ventralis Aurivillius, 1928
 Prosoplus vexatus (Pascoe, 1864)
 Prosoplus viduatus (Pascoe, 1864)
 Prosoplus villaris (Pascoe, 1864)
 Prosoplus villaroides Breuning, 1978
 Prosoplus woodlarkianus (Montrouzier, 1855)
 Prosoplus xyalopus (Karsch, 1881)

References

 
Pteropliini